Humphrey Hurd, Mayor of Galway 1655-56.

A Lieutenant-Colonel in the Cromwellian army of occupation in Ireland, Hurd was the first of the Protestant Mayors elected following the removal of the old tribal corporation. He was said to have originally been a carpenter by trade, and is listed as owning property seized from the tribal families in the town in a survey of 1657.

References
"History of Galway", James Hardiman, 1820
"Old Galway", Maureen Donovan O'Sullivan, 1942
The Tribes of Galway", Adrian J. Martyn, 2001
 Henry, William (2002). Role of Honour: The Mayors of Galway City 1485-2001. Galway: Galway City Council.  

Politicians from County Galway
Mayors of Galway
17th-century Irish businesspeople